Ferry Street is a QLine streetcar station in Detroit, Michigan. The station opened for service on May 12, 2017, and is located in Midtown Detroit. The station services the northern Cultural Center neighborhood as well as Wayne State University.

Destinations
 Wayne State University
 The Inn on Ferry Street
 Detroit Institute of Arts
 College for Creative Studies
 Detroit Public Library

Station
The station is sponsored by Fiat Chrysler Automobiles. It is heated and features security cameras and emergency phones. Passenger amenities include Wi-Fi and arrival signs.

See also

Streetcars in North America

References

Tram stops of QLine
Railway stations in Michigan at university and college campuses
Railway stations in the United States opened in 2017